Dennis L. A. White is an American actor noted for portraying Damion "D-Roc" Butler in the Notorious B.I.G. biopic entitled Notorious.

Early life
White was born and raised in Southern California in 1973,to a Grammy nominated mother and a military father. He was exposed to many different cultures and ideas. When his family relocated to Fayetteville, North Carolina he developed his love for music and acting. He was offered a baseball scholarship while a student at Westover High School to play baseball but he decided to take an academic scholarship at Winston-Salem State University in Winston-Salem, North Carolina.

Career
In 2001, Dennis, under the guise of "Dennis Da Menace", put out his Billboard charted album, The Wonderful World of Dennis. In 2003, Dennis became the first African-American host at Fuse Television. He began to host several TV shows: Weekend Vibe, HBO's 5 Rounds and Chatzone, and MTV's Hip Hop Life. 

White then pursued his love for acting with appearances in The Brave One with Jodie Foster, Law & Order: SVU, The Jury, I Think I Love My Wife, etc. In 2010, he portrayed a cancer stricken comedian in Marq Overton's Off Broadway play, Die Laughing. White also played Virgil on The N mini-series, Miracle's Boys. Dennis had a recurring role on TNT (TV channel)'s The Closer. In 2009, Dennis created "Act Like You Know", a company that gives acting workshops and seminars to aspiring actors across the country. In 2009, Dennis became the re-occurring character "Mistah Ray" on NBC's Parenthood. 

In 2013, Dennis started a foundation called "M.O.R.P.H." to help eradicate racial profiling. 

In 2018, Dennis strategically aligned his career and brand with personal manager, Jameelah "Just Jay" Wilkerson, President/CEO of The Hype Magazine Network; a media conglomerate based in North America. Wilkerson is also President of Marketing and Business Affairs with Palm Tree Entertainment, home to platinum-selling artists Soulja Boy and iHeartMemphis creator of the global smash Hit The Quan.

Filmography
Swimming (2000) - Jeeper
I Think I Love My Wife (2007) - Party Thug (uncredited)
The Brave One (2007) - Thug on Subway
Notorious (2009) - Damion
Three Chris's (2010) - Chris Walker
April's Fools (2010) - Tamil
Code Blue (2010)
King of Paper Chasin''' (2011) - J.B. (as Dennis Da Menace)After Hours: The Movie (2011) - Rugged & Menace hit manDysfunctional Friends (2012) - MinisterSmall Apartments (2012) - Marcus (as Dennis White)Changing the Game (2012) - Adult Dre (as Dennis LA White)Dreams (2013/I) - GageDreams (2013/II) - JermaineThe Genesis of Lincoln (2014) - T.J. McGriffLap Dance (2014) - Pauly Bleeding Hearts (2015) - Chris WalkerDiamond Ruff (2015) - Rev. Trek WoodsSweet Lorraine (2015) - Lincoln KennedyTrap City (2020) - Jacoby

TelevisionAtlanta (2016) ... Bald ManBlack Dynamite (2014) ... Arnold's Talking Stomach (voice)Parenthood (2011-2013) ... Mista RayNYC 22 (2012) ... TeefThe Closer (2010-2011) ... Reggie MosesLet's Talk About Pep (2010) Episode #1.3 (2010) ... Dennis WhiteMiracle's Boys (2005) (TV Mini-Series) ... VirgilJonny Zero (2005) ... PillsburyThe Jury (2004) ... Derrick Smith-BeyFuse's Summer Jam X (2003) (TV Movie) ... HostWeekend Vibe (2002) ... Segment Host (2004)

Video gamesThe Warriors (2005) - Sid, Glenn, Keenan, Jonah (voices, as Dennis White)Def Jam Fight for NY (2004) -  Baxter (voice, as Dennis Da Menace)

ProducerDreams (2013/I) - (associate producer)

SelfDaily Download (2004) - Daily Download (TV Series) - Himself - Host (2004) Adventures of Dennis Da Menace: South Beach (documentary) (2001) - Himself Chat Zone (2001) - (TV Series) - Host (2004)

References

 A. O. Scott. "Notorious (2009) A Rapper's Tale, Larger Than Life". New York Times''. 16 January 16, 2009
 Williams, Houston. "Dennis White: The Realest Thespian In Hollywood". allhiphop.com. 11 October 2010.
 Colclough, Glenys. "Notorious Elevation: A Conversation with Dennis LA White". Prominence Magazine. p. 43. Fall 2010.

External links
 M.O.R.P.H.
 

Living people
People from California
Year of birth missing (living people)
American male actors